Television in Jordan is dominated by pan-Arab satellite, with terrestrial accounting for 16% of TV households in the country. There are 29 free-to-air satellite channels headquartered in Jordan. Pay-TV penetration is low, estimated at 4% in 2011. 

The state broadcaster is the Jordan Radio and Television Corporation, which operates a domestic channel and broadcasts internationally via the Jordan Satellite channel.

The independent local channel Roya TV broadcasts local news, dramas and a variety of political, social and economic programmes.

List of major channels

The number of satellite television channels broadcasting from Jordan reached 45 at the end of 2015. However, here is a list of the major Jordanian TV channels:

 JRTV
Jordan Series Channel
Jordan News TV
Alhakeka
Nourmina Satellite Channel
Roya TV
Toyor al Jannah
Toyor baby
Al Mamlaka TV Channel

References

 
Television stations